Oxford Collapse were an American indie rock band from Brooklyn, New York. The band’s lineup included Michael Pace on vocals and guitars, Dan Fetherston on drums, and Adam Rizer on bass and vocals.

History
Oxford Collapse first released a limited press self-titled EP for the HCR label in 2002.

Shortly after they signed to Kanine Records, a label based in New York City/Brooklyn, where they released their first full-length album Some Wilderness in April 2004. This was followed by a remix of a track from the album titled "Melting the Ice Queen" in July of that year.

In October, the band released a 7-inch vinyl EP, entitled Songs For The Singers Of Panthers, on Discoloration Records before releasing their final effort from Kanine Records, A Good Ground.

The band then signed to indie label Sub Pop, where they released Remember The Night Parties in October 2006. The album earned a 7.9 out of 10 from Pitchfork Media, who also rated "Please Visit Your National Parks" 96th in their year-end "Top 100 Tracks of 2006" feature.

The latest studio album Bits was released on August 5, 2008. They supported We Are Scientists on their UK tour.

In June 2009, the band announced their split after eight years together.

Mike Pace has subsequently gone on to form the band The Child Actors, who released their first single in March 2012.

Discography

Albums
Some Wilderness (2004) Kanine Records
A Good Ground (2005) Kanine Records
Remember the Night Parties (2006) Sub Pop
Bits (2008) Sub Pop

EPs
Oxford Collapse (EP) (2002) HRC
Songs for the Singers of Panthers (7-inch, 2002) Discoloration Records
Melting the Ice Queen (remix) (12-inch, 2004) Kanine Records
The Hann-Byrd EP (12-inch, 2008) Comedy Minus One

Singles
 "Decking the Classics" (2006, Version City)
 "Please Visit Your National Parks" (2006) Sub Pop
 "Spike of Bensonhurst" (2008, Flameshovel)
 "The Birthday Wars" (2008, Sub Pop)
 "Young Love Delivers" (2008, Sub Pop)
 "Oxford Collapse & Joggers split 7-inch" (2009, Cocktail Partner)

References

External links 
 Oxford Collapse on Myspace
 Pitchfork review of Remember the Night Parties
 Remember the Night Parties at Metacritic
 Pitchfork review of A Good Ground
 Oxford Collapse interview at StereoSubversion.com

Indie rock musical groups from New York (state)
Musical groups from Brooklyn
Musical groups established in 2002
Musical groups disestablished in 2009
2002 establishments in New York City